Kannolli  is a village in the southern state of Karnataka, India. It is located in the Sindgi taluk of Bijapur district in Karnataka.

Demographics
 India census, Kannolli had a population of 5357 with 2757 males and 2600 females.
debbie thobbom

See also
 Bijapur district
 Districts of Karnataka

References

External links
 http://Bijapur.nic.in/

Villages in Bijapur district, Karnataka